The Auscii or Ausci were an Aquitani tribe dwelling around present-day Auch during the Iron Age. 

Alongside the Tarbelli, they were one of the most powerful peoples of Aquitania.

Name 
They are mentioned as Ausci by Caesar (mid-1st c. BC), Pliny (1st c. AD) and Pomponius Mela (mid-1st c. AD), and as Au̓skíois (Αὐσκίοις) by Strabo (early 1st c. AD).

The ethnonym Auscii may be related to the prefix eusk-, meaning 'Basque' in the Basque language (euskara).

The city of Auch, attested as civitas Auscius in the early 4th century AD, is named after the tribe.

Geography 
Their territory was located north of the Onobrisates, west of the Cambolectri and Volcae Tectosages, south of the Lactorates, west of the Atures.

The chief town of the Auscii was known as Elimberrum (modern Auch), whose name can be compared to the Basque ili-berri ('new town').

Culture 
It is believed that the Auscii spoke a form or dialect of the Aquitanian language, a precursor of the Basque language.

See also 
 Aquitani
 Gallia Aquitania

References

Bibliography 

Aquitani
Basque history